Chelebadze is a Georgian surname. Notable people with the surname include:

Giorgi Chelebadze (born 1992), Georgian footballer
Revaz Chelebadze (born 1955), Georgian footballer

Georgian-language surnames